Carl Hartmann (8 February 1894 – 24 June 1943) was a German international footballer who played for Union Potsdam and Victoria Hamburg.

References

External links
 
 
 

1894 births
1943 deaths
German footballers
Association football forwards
Germany international footballers
SC Victoria Hamburg players
Sportspeople from Potsdam
Footballers from Brandenburg

nds:Carl Hartmann (Footballspeler)